The name Elom may refer to:

Elom, a traditional name belonging to the Ewe people meaning "God loves me" or "beloved by God".
Elom (fictional race), a fictional alien race in the Star Wars franchise
Elom (Star Wars), the planet from which they originate